A list of books and essays about Vittorio De Sica:

Sica